Sirmilik National Park (Inuktitut: "the place of glaciers") is a national park located in Qikiqtaaluk, Nunavut, Canada, established in 1999.  Situated within the Arctic Cordillera, the park is composed of three areas: most of Bylot Island with the exception for a few areas that are Inuit-owned lands, Oliver Sound, and Baffin Island's Borden Peninsula. Much of the park is bordered by water.

Geographically, it is representative of the Northern Eastern Arctic Lowlands Natural Region as well as parts of the Lancaster Sound Marine Region.

Etymology
In the Inuktitut (or Inuit language, traditionally spoken across the North American Arctic) Sirmilik means "place of glaciers," as it represents Bylot Island's plethora of glaciers and ice caps. As Canadian Arctic Inuktitut-speakers referred to northern Baffin Island as Sirmilik, the name of the geographic region became the name of the national park.

History

Extensive archaeological exploration of the park area has indicated that the area has been inhabited by humans for thousands of years.  The earliest known are predecessors of the modern-day Inuit.

The area was explored by European whalers and by explorers in their search for the Northwest Passage. In the 1610s, the area was surveyed by British explorers William Baffin and Robert Bylot. They named several features of the area including Lancaster Sound and Bylot Island in 1616. It was 200 years before the next official attempt to find the Passage through this area.  The expedition by the British explorer John Ross in 1818 confirmed the accuracy of Baffin's charts, but ended when he saw what he believed were mountains blocking the end of Lancaster Sound. The area was later thoroughly explored during an extensive aerial mapping program of Northern Canada by the Canadian Government which took from the 1930s until the late 1950s to complete.

The Byam Martin Mountains on Bylot Island were climbed by Pat Biard and then Ben Farris in 1954, including Mount Thule. In 1963 British explorer Bill Tilman traversed the island, but did not climb any of the larger peaks. In 1977, a Canadian expedition of Rob Kelly and others climbed 20 peaks of Bylot Island, and in 1984 Mike Schmidt with others climbed 28 peaks, including 16 first recorded ascents.

The park was first established as a bird sanctuary in 1965 and monitored by the Canadian Wildlife Service because of its seabird colonies.  The area officially became a national park in 2001. Today, the area is inhabited by the Inuit who continue to hunt and fish as their ancestors did.

The park was the subject of a short film in 2011's National Parks Project, directed by Zacharias Kunuk and scored by Andrew Whiteman, Dean Stone and Tanya Tagaq.

Geography and climate

The park consists of three separate land and marine components. These are Oliver Sound, located to the south of Pond Inlet, characterised by a long narrow fjord flanked by towering cliffs and glaciers, the plateau and river valleys of the Borden Peninsula and Baillarge Bay, and finally Bylot Island, characterised by its rough terrain with mountains, coastal lowlands, icefields and glaciers. Hoodoos are unique eroded formations on Bylot Island and the Borden Peninsula.  Evidence shows that the area was scoured by the Laurentide Ice Sheet, a massive sheet of ice that covered hundreds of thousands of square miles at least 20,000 years ago.

Admiralty Inlet forms a western border, with Elwin Inlet also to the west, while Navy Board Inlet forms a border to the east, separating the peninsula from Bylot Island.

It is also one of the largest uninhabited islands in the world. While there are no permanent settlements on this Canadian Arctic island, Inuit from Pond Inlet and elsewhere regularly travel to Bylot Island. An Inuit seasonal hunting camp is located southwest of Cape Graham Moore. The Byam Martin Mountains extend from east to west across Bylot Island and are an extension of the Baffin Mountains which in turn form part of the Arctic Cordillera mountain system. The highest mountain in the range is Angilaaq Mountain, located near the island's centre. The Byam Martin Mountains are made up of Archean-Aphebian igneous crystalline rock and Proterozoic metasedimentary and metamorphic rock, such as gneiss. Sharp peaks and ridges, divided by deep glacier-filled valleys are typical features in the range and has been extensively modified by glacial erosion. Extensive glaciers dot the island including the Kaparoqtalik Glacier. Vertical cliffs along the coastline are made up of Precambrian dolomite. The island's north shore faces Lancaster Sound, a polar bear maternity den area, also noted for its high concentrations of marine wildlife. To the northeast of the park is Baffin Bay and to the south lies Pond Inlet and Eclipse Sound.

In the north of Baffin Island, there is a polar maritime climate which means long, cold winters and short, cool summers. The spring does not end until mid-June and the warmest period is late July and early August, with average maximum temperatures of 10 °C. The coldest month is January as the average maximum temperatures of about −30 °C. Rainfall is relatively abundant, contributing to the flora seen in the park.

Fauna and flora

Fauna
Beluga whales, Arctic foxes, seals, Arctic hares, walruses, and caribou are found in this park. Bylot Island is a migratory area for narwhals. Sirmilik is one of eight Canadian national parks that contains polar bears. Arctic wolves roam and inhabit this park.

A major seabird colony is located in the area of Baillarge Bay. Seabird colonies are also located on Bylot Island which have a large colony and nesting area of greater snow geese. More than seventy species of birds have been recorded here, of which about forty are known to breed. The park is known to be an important bird sanctuary. In 1965, Bylot Island enclosed within the park was also declared as a "Migratory Bird Sanctuary" in view of the large number of migratory birds in the area. A record 100,000 birds are reported to pass the park during summer months every year, and the large geese population of the island is known to constitute the most abundant herbivores of the island. On some of Bylot Island's rugged cliffs within the park, thousands of nesting birds can be found including 300,000 thick-billed murre and 80,000 black-legged kittiwake.

Flora
The wetlands of the park (10% of the area) have abundant vegetation of water sedge (Carex aquatilis), white cottongrass (Eriophorum scheuchzeri) and tall cottongrass (Eriophorum angustifolium). Other types of grass include the Fisher’s tundragrass (Dupontia fisheri), the polar grass (Arctagrostis latifolia) and semaphore grass (Pleuropogon sabinei). In addition, several species of brown moss have been recorded. In the Arctic environment of the southern part of the island 360 species of plants have been documented, which are considered to have rare quality and productivity.

Vegetation in the upland (on hill slopes and terraces) which constitute 90% of southern drier areas of the park consist of forbs, such as Arctic heather (Cassiope tetragona), mountain avens (Dryas integrifolia), Arctic poppy (Papaver radicatum) and mountain sorrel (Oxyria digyna), grasses, such as polar grass (Arctagrostis latifolia), northern foxtail (Alopecurus alpinus), bluegrass (Poa arctica) and northern wood rush (Luzula confusa) and shrubs, such as Arctic willow (Salix arctica) and northern bilberry (Vaccinium uliginosum).

Gallery

See also

List of national parks of Canada
List of protected areas of Nunavut

References

Further reading

Pynn, Larry. (2003). "Adventure – Journey to Sirmilik – Two Travellers Brave Winds, Shifting Ice Floes and Roiling Arctic Seas for a Glimpse of Canada's Newest National Park". Canadian Geographic. 123, no. 2: 34.

Parks in Qikiqtaaluk Region
Protected areas established in 2001
National parks in Nunavut
2001 establishments in Nunavut